The 1989 Texas Longhorns baseball team represented the University of Texas at Austin in the 1989 NCAA Division I baseball season. The Longhorns played their home games at Disch–Falk Field. The team was coached by Cliff Gustafson in his 22nd season at Texas.

The Longhorns reached the College World Series final, but were eliminated by Wichita State.

Personnel

Roster

Coaches

Schedule

! style="background:#BF5700;color:white;"| Regular season
|- valign="top" 

|- align="center" bgcolor="#ccffcc"
| February 8 ||  || Disch–Falk Field • Austin, TX || W 5–2 || 1–0 || 
|- align="center" bgcolor="#ccffcc"
| February 8 || St. Mary's (TX) || Disch–Falk Field • Austin, TX || W 4–1 || 2–0 || 
|- align="center" bgcolor="#ccffcc"
| February 10 ||  || Disch–Falk Field • Austin, TX || W 4–313 || 3–0 || 
|- align="center" bgcolor="#ccffcc"
| February 11 || UCLA || Disch–Falk Field • Austin, TX || W 6–3 || 4–0 || 
|- align="center" bgcolor="#ccffcc"
| February 12 || UCLA || Disch–Falk Field • Austin, TX || W 14–48 || 5–0 || 
|- align="center" bgcolor="#ccffcc"
| February 14 ||  || Disch–Falk Field • Austin, TX || W 8–1 || 6–0 || 
|- align="center" bgcolor="#ffbbb"
| February 14 || Texas Lutheran || Disch–Falk Field • Austin, TX || L 11–12 || 6–1 || 
|- align="center" bgcolor="#ccffcc"
| February 17 || at  || Packard Stadium • Tempe, AZ || W 10–3 || 7–1 || 
|- align="center" bgcolor="#ccffcc"
| February 18 || at Arizona State || Packard Stadium • Tempe, AZ || W 4–1 || 8–1 || 
|- align="center" bgcolor="#ffbbb"
| February 19 || at Arizona State || Packard Stadium • Tempe, AZ || L 4–8 || 8–2 || 
|- align="center" bgcolor="#ffbbb"
| February 21 ||  || Disch–Falk Field • Austin, TX || L 0–2 || 8–3 || 
|- align="center" bgcolor="#ccffcc"
| February 21 || Texas–Arlington || Disch–Falk Field • Austin, TX || W 18–10 || 9–3 || 
|- align="center" bgcolor="#ffbbb"
| February 24 ||  || Disch–Falk Field • Austin, TX || L 9–12 || 9–4 || 
|- align="center" bgcolor="#ffbbb"
| February 25 || Miami (FL) || Disch–Falk Field • Austin, TX || L 5–9 || 9–5 || 
|- align="center" bgcolor="#ccffcc"
| February 26 || Miami (FL) || Disch–Falk Field • Austin, TX || W 5–2 || 10–5 || 
|- align="center" bgcolor="#ccffcc"
| February 27 || Miami (FL) || Disch–Falk Field • Austin, TX || W 6–2 || 11–5 || 
|-

|- align="center" bgcolor="#ccffcc"
| March 1 ||  || Disch–Falk Field • Austin, TX || W 16–2 || 12–5 || 
|- align="center" bgcolor="#ccffcc"
| March 3 ||  || Disch–Falk Field • Austin, TX || W 22–11 || 13–5 || 
|- align="center" bgcolor="#ccffcc"
| March 7 ||  || Disch–Falk Field • Austin, TX || W 22–5 || 14–5 || 
|- align="center" bgcolor="#ccffcc"
| March 8 ||  || Disch–Falk Field • Austin, TX || W 21–8 || 15–5 || 
|- align="center" bgcolor="#ccffcc"
| March 10 ||  || Disch–Falk Field • Austin, TX || W 6–512 || 16–5 || 
|- align="center" bgcolor="#ccffcc"
| March 11 || Oklahoma || Disch–Falk Field • Austin, TX || W 13–9 || 17–5 || 
|- align="center" bgcolor="#ccffcc"
| March 12 ||  || Disch–Falk Field • Austin, TX || W 17–6 || 18–5 || 
|- align="center" bgcolor="#ccffcc"
| March 12 || Emporia State || Disch–Falk Field • Austin, TX || W 16–4 || 19–5 || 
|- align="center" bgcolor="#ccffcc"
| March 13 || Emporia State || Disch–Falk Field • Austin, TX || W 14–3 || 20–5 || 
|- align="center" bgcolor="#ccffcc"
| March 14 || Southwestern || Disch–Falk Field • Austin, TX || W 20–12 || 21–5 || 
|- align="center" bgcolor="#ccffcc"
| March 15 ||  || Disch–Falk Field • Austin, TX || W 8–1 || 22–5 || 
|- align="center" bgcolor="#ccffcc"
| March 16 || Southwest || Disch–Falk Field • Austin, TX || W 17–4 || 23–5 || 
|- align="center" bgcolor="#ccffcc"
| March 17 ||  || Disch–Falk Field • Austin, TX || W 6–2 || 24–5 || 
|- align="center" bgcolor="#ccffcc"
| March 17 || Dallas Baptist || Disch–Falk Field • Austin, TX || W 14–6 || 25–5 || 
|- align="center" bgcolor="#ffbbb"
| March 18 || Dallas Baptist || Disch–Falk Field • Austin, TX || L 7–15 || 25–6 || 
|- align="center" bgcolor="#ccffcc"
| March 18 || Dallas Baptist || Disch–Falk Field • Austin, TX || W 7–2 || 26–6 || 
|- align="center" bgcolor="#ccffcc"
| March 19 ||  || Disch–Falk Field • Austin, TX || W 3–0 || 27–6 || 
|- align="center" bgcolor="#ffbbb"
| March 20 ||  || Disch–Falk Field • Austin, TX || L 9–10 || 27–7 || 
|- align="center" bgcolor="#ccffcc"
| March 22 || Lubbock Christian || Disch–Falk Field • Austin, TX || W 9–0 || 28–7 || 
|- align="center" bgcolor="#ccffcc"
| March 24 || at  || Ferrell Field • Waco, TX || W 5–410 || 29–7 || 1–0
|- align="center" bgcolor="#ffbbb"
| March 25 || at Baylor || Ferrell Field • Waco, TX || L 0–6 || 29–8 || 1–1
|- align="center" bgcolor="#ccffcc"
| March 25 || at Baylor || Ferrell Field • Waco, TX || W 6–3 || 30–8 || 2–1
|- align="center" bgcolor="#ccffcc"
| March 28 ||  || Disch–Falk Field • Austin, TX || W 2–0 || 31–8 || 
|- align="center" bgcolor="#ffbbb"
| March 28 || Nebraska || Disch–Falk Field • Austin, TX || L 5–8 || 31–9 || 
|- align="center" bgcolor="#ccffcc"
| March 31 ||  || Disch–Falk Field • Austin, TX || W 6–0 || 32–9 || 3–1
|-

|- align="center" bgcolor="#ffbbb"
| April 1 ||  || Disch–Falk Field • Austin, TX || L 0–4 || 32–10 || 3–2
|- align="center" bgcolor="#ccffcc"
| April 1 || Rice || Disch–Falk Field • Austin, TX || W 5–4 || 33–10 || 4–2
|- align="center" bgcolor="#ccffcc"
| April 7 ||  || Disch–Falk Field • Austin, TX || W 8–2 || 34–10 || 5–2
|- align="center" bgcolor="#ccffcc"
| April 8 || Texas Tech || Disch–Falk Field • Austin, TX || W 13–3 || 35–10 || 6–2
|- align="center" bgcolor="#ccffcc"
| April 8 || Texas Tech || Disch–Falk Field • Austin, TX || W 4–1 || 36–10 || 7–2
|- align="center" bgcolor="#ccffcc"
| April 15 || at  || Olsen Field • College Station, TX || W 6–2 || 37–10 || 8–2
|- align="center" bgcolor="#ffbbb"
| April 16 || at Texas A&M || Olsen Field • College Station, TX || L 14–18 || 37–11 || 8–3
|- align="center" bgcolor="#ffbbb"
| April 16 || at Texas A&M || Olsen Field • College Station, TX || L 5–8 || 37–12 || 8–4
|- align="center" bgcolor="#ccffcc"
| April 17 || at  || L. Dale Mitchell Baseball Park • Norman, OK || W 10–9 || 38–12 || 
|- align="center" bgcolor="#ccffcc"
| April 18 || at Oklahoma || L. Dale Mitchell Baseball Park • Norman, OK || W 9–5 || 39–12 || 
|- align="center" bgcolor="#ccffcc"
| April 21 ||  || Disch–Falk Field • Austin, TX || W 5–2 || 40–12 || 9–4
|- align="center" bgcolor="#ccffcc"
| April 22 || Houston || Disch–Falk Field • Austin, TX || W 9–3 || 41–12 || 10–4
|- align="center" bgcolor="#ccffcc"
| April 22 || Houston || Disch–Falk Field • Austin, TX || W 10–8 || 42–12 || 11–4
|- align="center" bgcolor="#ccffcc"
| April 28 || at Arkansas || George Cole Field • Fayetteville, AR || W 5–4 || 43–12 || 12–4
|- align="center" bgcolor="#ffbbb"
| April 29 || at Arkansas || George Cole Field • Fayetteville, AR || L 4–8 || 43–13 || 12–5
|- align="center" bgcolor="#ffbbb"
| April 29 || at Arkansas || George Cole Field • Fayetteville, AR || L 7–14 || 43–14 || 12–6
|-

|- align="center" bgcolor="#ffbbb"
| May 5 ||  || Disch–Falk Field • Austin, TX || L 1–5 || 43–15 || 12–7
|- align="center" bgcolor="#ccffcc"
| May 6 || TCU || Disch–Falk Field • Austin, TX || W 10–2 || 44–15 || 13–7
|- align="center" bgcolor="#ccffcc"
| May 6 || TCU || Disch–Falk Field • Austin, TX || W 10–1 || 45–15 || 14–7
|-

|-
! style="background:#BF5700;color:white;"| Post-Season
|-

|- align="center" bgcolor="#ccffcc"
| May 18 || Arkansas || Olsen Field • College Station, TX || W 8–3 || 46–15 || 1–0
|- align="center" bgcolor="#ffbbb"
| May 19 ||  || Olsen Field • College Station, TX || L 6–15 || 46–16 || 1–1
|- align="center" bgcolor="#ccffcc"
| May 20 || Arkansas || Olsen Field • College Station, TX || W 9–1 || 47–16 || 2–1
|- align="center" bgcolor="#ffbbb"
| May 20 || Texas A&M || Olsen Field • College Station, TX || L 4–5 || 47–17 || 2–2
|-

|- align="center" bgcolor="#ccffcc"
| May 26 ||  || Disch–Falk Field • Austin, TX || W 2–0 || 48–17 || 1–0
|- align="center" bgcolor="#ccffcc"
| May 27 ||  || Disch–Falk Field • Austin, TX || W 11–8 || 49–17 || 2–0
|- align="center" bgcolor="#ccffcc"
| May 28 ||  || Disch–Falk Field • Austin, TX || W 8–7 || 50–17 || 3–0
|- align="center" bgcolor="#ccffcc"
| May 29 || New Orleans || Disch–Falk Field • Austin, TX || W 9–3 || 51–17 || 4–0
|-

|- align="center" bgcolor="#ccffcc"
| June 3 ||  || Johnny Rosenblatt Stadium • Omaha, NE || W 7–1 || 52–17 || 1–0
|- align="center" bgcolor="#ccffcc"
| June 5 || Miami (FL) || Johnny Rosenblatt Stadium • Omaha, NE || W 12–2 || 53–17 || 2–0
|- align="center" bgcolor="#ccffcc"
| June 8 ||  || Johnny Rosenblatt Stadium • Omaha, NE || W 12–7 || 54–17 || 3–0
|- align="center" bgcolor="#ffbbb"
| June 10 || vs Wichita State || Johnny Rosenblatt Stadium • Omaha, NE || L 3–5 || 54–18 || 3–1
|-

References

Texas Longhorns baseball seasons
Texas Longhorns
College World Series seasons
Texas Longhorns Baseball